The Amro River Protected Landscape is a protected landscape area located in the province of Aurora in eastern Central Luzon in the Philippines. It preserves the primary water source for agricultural, power generation and domestic consumption of the remote northern Auroran communities on the Pacific coast. The area was first established in 1990 as the Amro River Watershed Forest Reserve to protect, maintain and improve the water yield of the Amro River as declared through Proclamation No. 633 by President Corazón Aquino. In 2000, the forest reserve was reclassified as a protected landscape under the National Integrated Protected Areas System with the enactment of Proclamation No. 274 by President Joseph Estrada. It is one of five declared protected areas of the Philippines in Aurora.

Description
It extends along the Amro River from its headwaters near the irrigation dam built by the National Irrigation Administration (NIA) in the Sierra Madre mountain range to its foothills near the coast of Casiguran. The river is the third largest watershed area in Aurora after those of the Cabatangan–Malupa and Diteki rivers.

A hydroelectric power plant project with a capacity of 3 megawatts was recently awarded to Alternergy Viento Partners Corp., a renewable energy company, and will be built along the river within the protected area.

Wildlife
The park is known to be inhabited by a diverse wildlife species such as the water monitor, Philippine long-tailed macaque, Philippine deer, Philippine pygmy woodpecker, Philippine kingfisher and Brahminy kite. Its forest harbors an important flora consisting predominantly of dipterocarp tree species such as Shorea polysperma (tanguile), Shorea squamata (mayapis), Shorea contorta (white lauan), Shorea negrosensis (red lauan), Parashorea malaanonan (bagtikan), and Syzigium nitidum (makaasim).

References

Protected landscapes of the Philippines
Geography of Aurora (province)
Protected areas of the Sierra Madre (Philippines)
Protected areas established in 1990
1990 establishments in the Philippines